Marco Molin (1709- 1777) was the Bishop of Bergamo from 1773 to 1777.

Molin was born in Venice on 30 July 1709. He was ordained a priest on 19 September 1733. He served at the Monastery of San Giorgio in Venice as Master of Novices, then as Prior, then as Abbot. He was Visitor for his Order's Province of Lombardy. At the time of his appointment as bishop, he was Abbot of the Monastery of San Giustino in Padua.

He was named Bishop of Bergamo on 13 September 1773 by Pope Clement XIV, and was consecrated in Rome on 19 September 1773 by Cardinal Carlo Rezzonico.

He died in Bergamo on 2 March 1777.

References

Bibliography
 (in Latin)

External links
Araldica Ecclesiastica Marco Molin  

1709 births
1777 deaths
Bishops of Bergamo
18th-century Roman Catholic bishops in the Republic of Venice